Lee Balterman (1920 – March 16, 2012) was an American photographer. Born in Chicago, Illinois, Balterman graduated from high school in 1938, and later took evening classes in drawing and painting at the Art Institute of Chicago. In 1942, during World War II, Balterman enlisted in the US Army Reserves. First stationed in England, he then served in Clichy, France, working as a hospital aide and later as an army photographer. After being discharged in 1946, Balterman returned to Chicago and began working as a freelance photographer for the Globe, Rapho-Guillumette, and Black Star agencies, as well as producing covers for periodicals such as Life, Fortune, and Sports Illustrated. He was noted in particular as a photograph of ballet. He died in 2012, aged 91.

In popular media
In 2010, Balterman was interviewed by famous Chicago Cubs fan Jerry Pritikin, known as the Bleacher Preacher. During the interview, Balterman and Pritikin discussed Balterman's Cubs' stories and historical photo assignments.

References

American photographers
1920 births
2012 deaths
United States Army personnel of World War II
American expatriates in the United Kingdom
American expatriates in France